Vibe is a South Korean R&B group consisting of singers Yoon Min-soo and Ryu Jae-hyun. They debuted in 2002 as a trio with rapper Yoo Sung-gyu, who left the group after the release of their second album. Vibe has released eight studio albums, and numerous hit songs including "Love Me Once Again", "Long Long Time", "While Looking at the Picture", "That Man, That Woman", “Drinking,” and "Come Back to Me".

Career
Vibe was formed in 2002 by Yoon Min-soo, former member of vocal group 4Men, and were initially a trio consisting of Yoon, singer-songwriter Ryu Jae-hyun and rapper Yoo Sung-gyu. Their first single "미워도 다시 한번 (Although It Is Hateful, Again)" was a success and a huge hit for the group making them very popular. Their second single "Promise U" was also very successful. Their second album was released in November 2003 and their first single "오래 오래 (Long Long Time)" was a huge hit as was their second single "사진을 보다가 (While Looking at the Picture)". This cemented their status as a popular group and consistent hit makers. During the hiatus between their 2nd and 3rd albums, Yoo left the group as he wished to pursue his own style of music, taking on the stage name Noblesse. Vibe went on to release their 3rd album in 2006 which became a success with their two hits "그 남자, 그 여자 (That Man, That Woman)" and "술이야 (Drinking)". They were on hiatus from 2006 to 2009 as both members enlisted for their mandatory military service. Vibe released their 4th album and their title song was "다시 와주라" (Comeback Again). 

While Vibe has not been promoting together on a regular basis, Ryu and Yoon have been individually pursuing their solo careers. In 2011, Yoon joined the cast of MBC's I Am a Singer, and debuted singing "그 남자, 그 여자 (That Man, That Woman)" and "술이야 (Drinking)", obtaining second place behind Insooni (인순이). Ryu gained fame as a composer and producer, composing for the likes of SG Wannabe, SeeYa and F.T. Island. Vibe was the featured legend on Immortal Songs: Singing the Legend episode 531, which aired on November 6, 2021.

Discography

Studio albums

Singles

Awards and nominations

References

External links 
Official website

South Korean boy bands
South Korean contemporary R&B musical groups
Musical groups established in 2002
2002 establishments in South Korea